Kankia (or Kankiya) is a Local Government Area in Katsina State, Nigeria. Its headquarters are in the town of Kankia in the north of the area on the A9 highway at.

It has an area of 824 km and a population of 151,434 at the 2006 census.

The postal code of the area is 822.

References

Local Government Areas in Katsina State